Cantillon is a surname. Notable people with the surname include:

 Daniel Cantillon (born 1945), American fencer.
 Estelle Cantillon, economist.
 Joe Cantillon (1861–1930), American baseball manager and umpire.
 Marie André Cantillon (1781/82 - 1869), French army officer and failed assassin
 Paddy Cantillon (fl. 1901), Irish hurler.
 Phil Cantillon (born 1976), British rugby league footballer.
 Richard Cantillon (–1734), Irish-French economist.
Cantillon effect, economic concept proposed by Richard Cantillon.

See also
 Cantillon Brewery, a Belgian brewery.